The Long Hills are a group of hills and rock outcroppings about  in extent, located midway between the Wisconsin Range and the Ohio Range in the Horlick Mountains of Antarctica. Knack Point marks the north end of the Long Hills. They were mapped by the United States Geological Survey from surveys and U.S. Navy aerial photographs, 1958–60, and were named by the Advisory Committee on Antarctic Names for William E. Long, a geologist with the Horlick Mountains Traverse, 1958–59, and also a member of the Ohio State University expedition to the Horlick Mountains in 1960–61 and 1961–62.

See also
Victor Cliff

References

Hills of Antarctica
Wilkes Land
Transantarctic Mountains